Fervidicoccus fontis is a species of anaerobic organotroph archaeum belonging to the kingdom Thermoproteota. It is thermophilic and slightly acidophilic, being found at the Uzon Caldera at temperatures between 75 °C and 80 °C. Cells are single cocci of 1–3 μm in diameter with no archaella.

References

Further reading 

Thermoproteota